The 2013 PartyPoker.com World Grand Prix was the sixteenth staging of the  World Grand Prix. It was played from 7–13 October 2013 at the Citywest Hotel in Dublin, Ireland.

Michael van Gerwen was the defending champion having won his first major PDC ranking title in 2012 with a 6–4 defeat over Mervyn King. However, he lost in the quarter-finals to Dave Chisnall. Chisnall went on to reach his first major PDC final but lost 6–0 to Phil Taylor, who claimed his 11th and final Grand Prix title.

Prize money
The total prize fund was £350,000. The following is the breakdown of the fund:

Qualification
The field of 32 players were made up from the top 16 in the PDC Order of Merit on September 23. The remaining 16 places went to the top 14 non-qualified players from the ProTour Order of Merit and then to the top 2 non-qualified residents of the Republic of Ireland and Northern Ireland from the 2013 ProTour Order of Merit.

Draw
The draw was made on 22 September 2013.

References

External links
Official website

World Grand Prix (darts)
World Grand Prix
World Grand Prix (darts)